Andy Hardy's Double Life is a 1942 comedy film directed by George B. Seitz. It was the thirteenth installment of MGM's enormously popular Andy Hardy film series starring Mickey Rooney as the title character.

It was the feature film debut of Esther Williams. It was the last Hardy film to include the character Polly Benedict, Andy's long-suffering sweetheart, as well as the last to feature Ann Rutherford (who had taken over the role of Polly in the second film of the series).

Premise
Preparing himself for college life, Andy Hardy (Mickey Rooney) promises himself to put an end to his flirting ways and attempts to organize his finances by selling his old car. Things become complicated when his love interest Polly (Ann Rutherford) introduces him to a seductive psychology student (Esther Williams), while his friends continue to delay the payment for his automobile. Andy also tries his best to help his sister Marian (Cecilia Parker) with her own relationship problems and takes an interest in assisting his father Judge Hardy (Lewis Stone) with a complicated case involving an injured boy (Bobby Blake).

Cast
 Lewis Stone as Judge Hardy
 Mickey Rooney as Andy Hardy
 Cecilia Parker as Marian Hardy
 Fay Holden as Mrs. Hardy
 Ann Rutherford as Polly Benedict
 Sara Haden as Aunt Milly Forrest
 Esther Williams as Sheila Brooks
 William Lundigan as Jeff Willis
 Robert Pittard as Botsy
 Bobby Blake as "Tooky" Stedman
 Susan Peters as Sue

Reception
According to MGM records the film earned $1,782,000 in the US and Canada and $865,000 elsewhere, making a profit of $1,499,000.

References

External links
 
 
 
 

1942 films
1942 romantic comedy films
American romantic comedy films
American black-and-white films
Films directed by George B. Seitz
Films scored by Daniele Amfitheatrof
Metro-Goldwyn-Mayer films
1940s English-language films
1940s American films